1960 Academy Awards may refer to:

 32nd Academy Awards, the Academy Awards ceremony that took place in 1960
 33rd Academy Awards, the 1961 ceremony honoring the best in film for 1960